The Deputy Minister of Transport (Malay: Timbalan Menteri Pengangkutan; ; Tamil: போக்குவரத்து துணை அமைச்சர் ) is a Malaysian cabinet position serving as deputy head of the Ministry of Transport.

List of Deputy Ministers of Transport
The following individuals have been appointed as Deputy Minister of Transport, or any of its precedent titles:

Colour key (for political coalition/parties):

See also 
 Minister of Transport (Malaysia)

References 

Ministry of Transport (Malaysia)